The Populars for Reform was a Christian-democratic and liberal political party in Italy.

It was founded in 1992 by Mario Segni as a split from Christian Democracy. The main goal of the party was electoral reform from proportional representation to a first-past-the-post system. In 1993 it merged with Democratic Alliance, which had identical goals, but, when that party decided to take part to the Alliance of Progressives with the ex-Communist Democratic Party of the Left, Segni set up an independent party again: the Segni Pact, which contested the 1994 general election in coalition with the Italian People's Party, named Pact for Italy.

References

Defunct political parties in Italy
Christian democratic parties in Italy
Catholic political parties
Political parties established in 1992
Political parties disestablished in 1993